Caspase-8 is a caspase protein, encoded by the CASP8 gene. It most likely acts upon caspase-3.
CASP8 orthologs have been identified in numerous mammals for which complete genome data are available. These unique orthologs are also present in birds.

Function 

The CASP8 gene encodes a member of the cysteine-aspartic acid protease (caspase) family. Sequential activation of caspases plays a central role in the execution-phase of cell apoptosis. Caspases exist as inactive proenzymes composed of a prodomain, a large protease subunit, and a small protease subunit. Activation of caspases requires proteolytic processing at conserved internal aspartic residues to generate a heterodimeric enzyme consisting of the large and small subunits. This protein is involved in the programmed cell death induced by Fas and various apoptotic stimuli. The N-terminal FADD-like death effector domain of this protein suggests that it may interact with Fas-interacting protein FADD. This protein was detected in the insoluble fraction of the affected brain region from Huntington disease patients but not in those from normal controls, which implicated the role in neurodegenerative diseases. Many alternatively spliced transcript variants encoding different isoforms have been described, although not all variants have had their full-length sequences determined.

Clinical significance 

A very rare genetic disorder of the immune system can also be caused by mutations in this gene.  This disease, called CEDS, stands for “Caspase eight deficiency state.”  CEDS has features similar to ALPS, another genetic disease of apoptosis, with the addition of an immunodeficient phenotype.  Thus, the clinical manifestations include splenomegaly and lymphadenopathy, in addition to recurrent sinopulmonary infections, recurrent mucocutaneous herpesvirus, persistent warts and molluscum contagiosum infections, and hypogammaglobulinemia. There is sometimes lymphocytic infiltrative disease in parenchymal organs, but autoimmunity is minimal and lymphoma has not been observed in the CEDS patients.  CEDS is inherited in an autosomal recessive manner.

The clinical phenotype of CEDS patients represented a paradox since caspase-8 was considered to be chiefly a proapoptotic protease, that was mainly involved in signal transduction from Tumor necrosis factor receptor family death receptors such as Fas. The defect in lymphocyte activation and protective immunity suggested that caspase-8 had additional signaling roles in lymphocytes. Further work revealed that caspase-8 was essential for the induction of the transcription factor “nuclear factor κB” (NF-κB) after stimulation through antigen receptors, Fc receptors, or Toll-like receptor 4 in T, B, and natural killer cells.

Biochemically, caspase-8 was found to enter the complex of the inhibitor of NF-κB kinase (IKK) with the upstream Bcl10-MALT1 (mucosa-associated lymphatic tissue) adapter complex which were crucial for the induction of nuclear translocation of NF-κB.  Moreover, the biochemical form of caspase-8 differed in the two pathways.  For the death pathway, the caspase-8 zymogen is cleaved into subunits that assemble to form the mature, highly active caspase heterotetramer whereas for the activation pathway, the zymogen appears to remain intact perhaps to limit its proteolytic function but enhance its capability as an adapter protein.

Interactions 
Caspase-8 has been shown to interact with:

 BCAP31, 
 BID, 
 Bcl-2, 
 CFLAR, 
 Caspase-10, 
 Caspase-2, 
 Caspase-3, 
 Caspase-6,
 Caspase-7, 
 Caspase-9, 
 DEDD, 
 FADD, 
 FasL, 
 FasR, 
 IFT57, 
 NOL3, 
 PEA15, 
 RIPK1, 
 TNFRSF10B,  and
 TRAF1.

Additional photos

See also 

 Caspase
 FADD
 The Proteolysis Map

References

Further reading

External links 
 The MEROPS online database for peptidases and their inhibitors: C14.009
 Apoptosis & Caspase 8—The Proteolysis Map (animation)
 
 caspase-8
 

Proteases
EC 3.4.22
Caspases